PCSB Bank is a bank based in Yorktown Heights, New York. It is a wholly owned subsidiary of PCSB Financial Corporation, a bank holding company.

It has 15 branches.

History
The bank was established in 1871 in Brewster, New York as the Putnam County Savings Bank.

In April 2015, the bank acquired CMS Bancorp.

In October 2015, the bank changed its name to PCSB Bank.

In April 2017, the company converted itself from a mutual organization to a joint-stock company and became a public company via an initial public offering.

In May 2022, The company was acquired by Brookline Bancorp for $313 Million.

References

External links

Banks based in New York (state)
Banks established in 1871
Companies listed on the Nasdaq